Balthasar Riepp (22 November 1703, Kempten - 2 August 1764 in Vils) was a German-Austrian painter, primarily of religious subjects.

Life 
Riepp's father was a servant at the Fürstäbtliche Residenz (a monastery complex) in Kempten. Prince-Abbot  helped provide him with a basic education, which included drawing lessons from the court painter .

In 1728, Riepp was offered employment in the highly successful workshop of Paul Zeiller in Reutte. Seven years later, he married Zeiller's daughter, Maria Anna. By that time, he was a sought-after artist with students of his own. In 1738, when Zeiller died, Riepp took over management of his art school.

In 1740, shortly after obtaining his Bürgerrechtes (citizenship) in Reutte, Riepp's only child, Johann Anton Laurentius, died. He began drinking heavily, which led to a separation from his wife and, as his condition worsened, he was accused of offending public morals. Soon, he felt it was necessary to leave Reutte. His dependence on alcohol, combined with his generosity toward the needy, slowly reduced him to poverty and homelessness. He died in an emergency shelter in Vils.

Streets in Reutte and Biberbach have been named in Riepp's honor. For the 300th anniversary of his birth in 2003, an exhibition called Genie im Schatten (Genius in the Shadows) toured Kempten, Reutte, Breitenwang and Vils.

References

Further reading 
 Josef Mair: Der Maler Balthasar Riepp (1703–1764). Hommage zum 300. Geburtsjahr. Ehrenberg-Verlag, Reutte 2003,

External links 

 ArtNet: More works by Riepp
 

1703 births
1764 deaths
18th-century German painters
18th-century German male artists
German male painters
Religious art